The Australian cricket team toured India in September 2022 to play three Twenty20 International (T20I) matches as a preparatory series before 2022 ICC Men's T20 World Cup. They later returned in February and March 2023 to play four Test and three One Day International (ODI) matches. The Test matches formed part of the 2021–2023 ICC World Test Championship.

Australia won the first T20I by 4 wickets, to lead the series 1–0. The second T20I was reduced to 8 overs per side due to a wet outfield, with India winning the match by 6 wickets. India won the third and final T20I by 6 wickets to win the series 2–1.

India won the Test series 2—1,  and retained the Border-Gavaskar Trophy. Australia's win in the third Test secured their place in the World Test Championship final. Results in other matches confirmed that India also qualified for the Championship final after the drawn fourth Test.

Scheduling
In August 2022, the Board of Control for Cricket in India (BCCI) confirmed the schedule for the T20Is. In 8 December 2022, the BCCI confirmed the schedule for the Tests and the ODIs.

On 13 February 2023, BCCI confirmed the venue of third test was shifted from Dharamshala to Indore. The ground was rated "poor" by the International Cricket Council (ICC) and received three demerit points.

Squads

Before the start of T20I series, Mitchell Marsh, Mitchell Starc and Marcus Stoinis were ruled out due to injuries, and were replaced by Sean Abbott, Nathan Ellis and Daniel Sams. India's Mohammed Shami was ruled of the T20I series due to COVID-19,  with Umesh Yadav named as his replacement.

On 10 January 2023, Mitchell Starc was ruled out of the first Test against India due to finger injury. On 1 February 2023, Shreyas Iyer was ruled out of the first Test against Australia due to back injury. On 5 February 2023, Josh Hazlewood was ruled out of the first Test against India due to achilles niggle in his left leg. On 7 February 2023, Cameron Green was ruled out of the first Test against India due to fractured finger. Ahead of the second Test, Matthew Kuhnemann replaced Mitchell Swepson in Australia's squad. On 12 February 2023, Jaydev Unadkat was released from India’s squad for second Test, to play Ranji Trophy Final. On 20 February 2023, Australia's Josh Hazlewood was ruled out of Test series. Mitchell Swepson re-joined the squad prior to the third Test. On 21 February 2023, Australia's David Warner was ruled out of the last two Tests due to elbow injury. On 22 February 2023, Ashton Agar was released from Australia's squad for last two Tests, to play Sheffield Shield and Marsh One-Day Cup. Pat Cummins was unavailable for the last two Tests due to a family emergency, with Steve Smith named as captain.

On 19 February 2023, BCCI confirmed that Rohit Sharma would be unavailable for the first ODI due to family commitments, with Hardik Pandya named as the captain in his place. On 6 March 2023, Australia's Jhye Richardson was ruled out from the ODI series due to a hamstring injury, with Nathan Ellis named as his replacement. On 14 March 2023, Pat Cummins left the ODI squad due to family problems, with Steve Smith named as the captain in his absence. On 14 March 2023, Shreyas Iyer was ruled out of the ODI series due to recurrence of back injury.

T20I series

1st T20I

2nd T20I

3rd T20I

Test series

1st Test

With the pitch seeming likely to favour spinners, India played three spinners, while Australia played two, giving Murphy his debut. Australia also dropped Head, in a decision which was widely criticised in Australia, replacing him with Handscomb. So the Indian team was Sharma, Rahul, Pujara, Kohli, Suryakumar Yadav (batters), Bharat (wicket-keeper), Ashwin, Jadeja, Patel (spin bowlers), Shami and Siraj (fast bowlers); and the Australian team was Kuwaja, Warner, Labuschagne, Smith, Handscomb, Renshaw (batters), Carey (wicket-keeper), Lyon, Murphy (spin bowlers), Cummins and Boland (fast bowlers).

Despite a modest first-innings total of 177, Australia's position looked reasonable when India were 168 for 5, despite Sharma going on to make 120. But Jadeja (70) and Patel (84) gave India a large lead. The Australia were then bowled out in their second innings for 91, appearing to have no answer to India's spinners, who took 16 wickets between them for the match.

2nd Test

3rd Test

4th Test

ODI series

1st ODI

2nd ODI

3rd ODI

Notes

References

External links
 Series home at ESPNcricinfo (T20Is)
 Series home at ESPNcricinfo (Tests and ODIs)

2022 in Indian cricket
2022 in Australian cricket
International cricket competitions in 2022–23
Australian cricket tours of India
Current cricket tours